Andrew Norman (born 1979) is an American composer of contemporary classical music.

Andrew Norman may also refer to:

 Andrew Norman (snooker player) (born 1980), former English professional snooker player from Bristol
Andrew Norman (rugby league) (born 1972), Papua New Guinean rugby league footballer who played in the 1990s and 2000s
Andrew Norman Meldrum (1876–1934), Scottish scientist
Andrew Norman (priest) (born 1963), principal of Ridley Hall, Cambridge
Andrew Norman Wilson (artist) (born 1983), artist and curator from New York City